AFM Bahauddin Nasim is a Bangladesh Awami League politician and current Joint General Secretary of Bangladesh Awami League. He is a former MP of Madaripur-3 Constituency.

Early life
He has a Bachelor of Science degree from Sher-e-Bangla Agricultural University.

Career
Nasim started his political career by joining Bangladesh Student League. He was president and also secretary of Bangladesh Student League Sher-e-Bangla Agricultural University Unit. In 1981, he became president of Bangladesh Student League, Madaripur District unit. He was the President of the Bangladesh Awami Swechasebak League. He was Assistant Personal Secretary -2 of Prime Minister Sheikh Hasina 1996-2001 period. He was elected to parliament in 2014 from Madaripur-3 as a Bangladesh Awami League candidate. In 2017, he was acquainted by a on a corruption case filed by the Anti-Corruption Commission. He was a member of the treasury bench of the Parliament of Bangladesh. He is now Joint General Secretary of Bangladesh Awami League.

Personal life 
AFM Bahauddin Nasim was born on 11 November 1961 in Madaripur, Faridpur district of East Pakistan. Nasim is married to Dr. Sultana Shamima Chowdhury.

References

Awami League politicians
Living people
10th Jatiya Sangsad members
1961 births